The January 2016 United States blizzard was a blizzard that produced up to 3 ft (91 cm) of snow in parts of the Mid-Atlantic and Northeastern United States from January 22–24, 2016. Evolving from a shortwave trough that formed in the Pacific Northwest on January 19, the system consolidated into a defined low-pressure area on January 21 over Texas. Winter weather expert Paul Kocin described the blizzard as "kind of a top-10 snowstorm".

On January 20–22, the governors of eleven states and the mayor of Washington, D.C. declared a state of emergency in anticipation of significant snowfall and blizzard conditions. Approximately 103 million people were affected by the storm, with 33 million people placed under blizzard warnings. More than 13,000 flights were cancelled in relation to the storm, with effects rippling internationally. Thousands of National Guardsmen were placed on standby, and states deployed millions of gallons of brine and thousands of tons of road salt to lessen the storm's effect on roadways. A travel ban was instituted for New York City and Newark, New Jersey, for January 23–24. The storm was given various unofficial names, including Winter Storm Jonas, Blizzard of 2016, and Snowzilla.

Ice- and snow-covered roads led to hundreds of incidents across the affected region, several of which resulted in deaths and injuries. At least 55 people were killed in storm-related incidents: Twelve in Virginia; nine in Pennsylvania; six each in New Jersey, New York, and North Carolina; four in South Carolina; three each in Maryland and Washington, D.C.; and one each in Arkansas, Delaware, Georgia, Kentucky, Massachusetts, and Ohio. Total economic losses are estimated between $500 million and $3 billion. The storm ranked as a Category 5 "extreme" event for the Northeast on the Regional Snowfall Index, and a Category 4 event for the Southeast. It is the most recent winter storm to rank as a Category 5 winter storm, and the first to do so since the 2011 Groundhog Day blizzard.

Preceding storm
A relatively minor storm ahead of the blizzard, similar to an Alberta clipper, caught numerous drivers off-guard, producing a brief period of heavy snow during rush hour in the Mid-Atlantic region on January 20. Although only  of snow fell in Washington, D.C., roadways were not treated; any snow that melted on roads quickly froze into black ice, rendering them impassable. Some referred to the event as "Carmageddon 2.0". Portions of Interstate 95 and Interstate 495 in Virginia and Maryland (especially on the Woodrow Wilson Bridge), as well as Interstate 270, were brought to a standstill through the early hours of January 21. Virginia State Police responded to 767 accidents and 392 reports of disabled vehicles. The Virginia Department of Transportation mobilized 115 salt trucks to clear roads. A man was killed after being struck by a snow plow in Beltsville, Maryland. Washington, D.C. Mayor Muriel Bowser issued an apology for inadequate preparations in the wake of the storm on January 22. Vehicles in Maryland became stranded, with some residents abandoning their cars altogether.

Georgia Governor Nathan Deal issued a state of emergency for northern counties on January 19, ensuring areas were better prepared than during a similar storm in 2014. Icy conditions prompted road closures in northern Georgia, including portions of Interstate 75; several crashes resulted from the dangerous conditions. Similar conditions affected Tennessee and Kentucky; schools closed on account of dangerous roads. One person died and another was injured in an accident in Knox County after speeding on slippery roads. Two deaths resulted from snow-related car accidents in North Carolina. Another person died, and two others were injured, when a car collided with a salt truck in Whitley County, Kentucky.

Meteorological history

The development of the winter storm was anticipated by forecasters for at least a week. It originated in a shortwave trough—a weather disturbance in the upper atmosphere—that came ashore at the Pacific Northwest on January 19. The trough strengthened as it moved southeastward through the Great Plains, and on January 21 it spawned a weak low-pressure area over central Texas. The incipient storm system began to intensify as it tracked eastward through the Gulf Coast states, triggering a line of strong to severe thunderstorms and multiple tornado warnings.

During the mid-afternoon hours of January 22, a new low-pressure area began to develop over the coast of the Carolinas, as the former storm tracked into central Georgia. Owing to uncertainty in short-range guidance but a high confidence of a sharp northern edge of precipitation, many forecasts were predicting 12" of snow or less until just hours before snowfall began, from Allentown, Pennsylvania, toward New York City and the southern coast of New England. As the storm moved further north and rapidly strengthened, it became apparent that snowfall would be much higher farther north, and forecasters quickly began upgrading their totals. Early on January 24, as the storm was leaving New England, the system began to become elongated, as a secondary low developed to the southwest of the storm's central low. On January 25, the blizzard left the East Coast of the United States; on the same day, the system was named Karin by the University of Berlin.

Accompanied by a strong jet stream in the Atlantic, the remnants of the storm crossed the British Isles on January 26. The wind and rain associated with the low was forecast to have the potential to cause disruption in the United Kingdom, and indeed there were areas that saw severe weather. During the next few days, the system accelerated towards the northeast. On January 29, the storm system was absorbed by Windstorm Leone, over Finland.

Preparations

Multiple offices of the National Weather Service issued various watches and warnings across the storm's projected path. Blizzard warnings covered coastal Connecticut; most of Delaware; most of Maryland; Massachusetts, particularly Martha's Vineyard; most of New Jersey; New York, including New York City; Pennsylvania; Rhode Island, especially Block Island; Virginia; and Washington, D.C. Winter storm warnings were issued from Arkansas to Massachusetts, including parts of Connecticut, northern Georgia, extreme southern Illinois, extreme southern Indiana, the entirety of Kentucky, extreme northeastern Louisiana, southeastern Massachusetts, northeastern Mississippi, extreme southeastern Missouri, extreme southern New York, most of North Carolina, southern Ohio, southern Rhode Island, northern South Carolina, most of Tennessee, most of Virginia, and all of West Virginia. Freezing rain advisories covered parts of North and South Carolina. Further winter weather advisories covered additional portions of the country, including eastern Kansas, southeastern Missouri, and northern Alabama. Offshore, storm warnings covered areas from Georgia to Maine.

On January 21–22, the governors of Delaware, Georgia, Kentucky, Maryland, New York, New Jersey, North Carolina, Virginia, Pennsylvania, Tennessee, West Virginia, and the mayor of Washington, D.C. declared a state of emergency in anticipation of significant snowfall and blizzard conditions.

Airlines cancelled more than 1,000 flights, with hundreds more preemptively grounded, by the afternoon of January 21 for January 22–24. Ripple effect cancellations spread across the entire East Coast. By the afternoon of January 23, more than 10,100 flights were cancelled across the country, affecting well over 100,000 travelers. Nearly 2,000 more flights were delayed. Most airports in the Mid-Atlantic region suspended service altogether, with Baltimore–Washington International, Philadelphia International Airport, Ronald Reagan Washington National, and Washington Dulles International closed through the evening of January 24. Flights to and from LaGuardia, John F. Kennedy International, and Newark Liberty International were largely cancelled as well. American Airlines suspended all flights departing from Charlotte-Douglas International Airport, causing a ripple of flights being cancelled throughout the country. Effects rippled internationally, with more than 100 flights in Canada, Mexico, and the United Kingdom cancelled. Altogether, 13,046 flights were cancelled between January 22 and 26.

Multiple sporting events, including those held by the Atlantic Coast Conference, National Basketball Association, and the National Hockey League, were postponed by the storm, while the National Football League's Arizona Cardinals vs. Carolina Panthers NFC Championship went on as planned for January 24 in Charlotte.

Mid-Atlantic

A snow emergency was declared for Washington, D.C., meaning that residents would not be allowed to park on snow emergency routes after 9:30 p.m. local time on January 22. Mayor Bowser urged people to remain home during the storm, "[u]nless you absolutely have to be out tomorrow afternoon [January 22], residents should get home as soon as possible". Across Maryland, 2,700 pieces of snow equipment were mobilized and crews planned to distribute 365,000 tons of road salt. In Virginia, 500 vehicles were deployed to treat roads and 500 members of the Virginia National Guard were placed on standby. Schools across the D.C. area were scheduled to end classes early on January 22, before the storm's arrival. Stores across Maryland, Virginia, and Washington, D.C. reported a substantial uptick in sales, with groceries, heaters, shovels, and similar items sold out in numerous locations. West Virginia Governor Earl Ray Tomblin mobilized the state's National Guard on January 21.

The Washington Metropolitan Area Transit Authority (WMATA) announced on January 21 that it would shut down its entire mass transit system over the weekend of January 22 and 23, including the Washington Metro and Metrobus, making it the longest such shutdown in the agency's history. On January 25, the WMATA operated limited Metro bus service, as well as rail service only on the underground portions of the Red, Green, and Orange Lines; however, fares were not charged. In Richmond, Virginia, all flights out of Richmond International Airport on January 23 were cancelled, and the Greater Richmond Transit Company (GTRC) bus system took the rare step of suspending all routes on January 24.

The Pennsylvania Department of Transportation had 2,200 vehicles and more than 733,000 tons of road salt on standby for use. Trucks deployed brine across major roads in and around Philadelphia, though residents were advised to avoid travel unless necessary. A travel ban was declared for Lancaster, Lebanon, Newberry Township, and York on January 23. The Southeastern Pennsylvania Transportation Authority issued a near complete shutdown of its services, shutting down all bus services and closing all rail except for the Broad Street Line and  Market-Frankford Line subways.

New York City mayor Bill de Blasio declared a hazardous travel advisory for the city, encouraging people not to travel; however, he did not ban traveling. On January 22, he declared a "winter weather emergency" and told residents to "Get done what you have to get done today ... Do not bring your vehicle out tomorrow". Taking place a year after a storm prompted the closure of the city's subway system in January 2015, only to largely bypass the city, Governor Andrew Cuomo stated that services would remain running. Approximately 1,800 workers equipped with 800 heaters were to keep rails clear for use. Thousands of sanitation workers, 1,700 plows, and 150,000 tons of road salt were on standby to clear city roads. He also put 600 members of the New York National Guard on standby. More than 50 power workers from Vermont were dispatched to Long Island to help restore power outages. Around noon on January 23, owing to a significant increase in expected snowfall, Cuomo issued a travel ban for all roads in New York City and Long Island. The New York City Transit Authority suspended bus service; rail service on the Long Island Rail Road, Metro-North, and Staten Island Railway; and elevated subway service (with underground subway lines remaining open until further notice). In the meantime, the Port Authority of New York and New Jersey closed bridges and tunnels in the region.

A travel ban was instituted for Newark, New Jersey, on January 23 through the afternoon of January 24 in light of hundreds of snow-related accidents.

Strong winds coupled with prolonged onshore flow resulted in a major coastal flood threat for Delaware and New Jersey. In New Jersey, a mandatory evacuation was ordered for residents in coastal Barnegat Township in anticipation of significant coastal flooding; several other towns were placed under voluntary evacuation orders.

Delaware Governor Jack Markell declared a "level 1 driving warning", encouraging people not to travel and indicating drivers should be extra cautious. The Delaware Department of Transportation had 330 snow plows ready to clear roads, though many areas were expected to be impassible on January 23. Shelters were also opened for the homeless. In New Castle County and Kent County in Delaware the Department of Transportation and Governor Jack Markell declared a Level 2 driving restriction (essential personnel on the roads only.)

Southeast
Anticipating a damaging ice storm, approximately 4,500 linemen were placed on standby to repair downed power lines in North Carolina; 1,000 state transportation workers also prepared for heavy snowfall, with crews placed on 12-hour shifts to be deployed as needed. Crews from across the country arrived to assist North Carolina power companies. Two million gallons of brine were used to pre-treat roads statewide. Across Tennessee, state offices closed for January 22, warming centers opened, and the Red Cross placed shelters on standby. The Tennessee Highway Patrol asked for people to remain off the roads, saying, "We are desperately asking you please DON'T DRIVE".

British Isles
The storm was forecast to cross the Atlantic Ocean and affect the British Isles from January 26 to 28. The storm was expected to be less severe, with rain rather than snow; however, the possibility of strong winds and localized flooding was noted. Particular concern was raised over areas that suffered from significant flooding during the preceding months. The storm in the British Isles was far less severe than in the United States and Storm Gertrude a few days later may have been worse.

Impact

At least 55 fatalities have been attributed to the storm and its aftermath: 12 in Virginia, 9 in Pennsylvania, 6 in New Jersey, 6 in New York, 6 in North Carolina, 4 in South Carolina, 3 in Maryland, 3 in Washington, D.C., 1 in Arkansas, 1 in Delaware, 1 in Georgia, 1 in Kentucky, 1 in Massachusetts, and 1 in Ohio. Throughout the affected region, more than 631,000 people lost power: 270,000 in New Jersey, 147,000 in North Carolina, 66,000 in Georgia, 55,000 in Virginia, 47,000 collectively in Delaware and Maryland, and nearly 30,000 in South Carolina.

Economic losses—from lost sales revenue and wages—are estimated between $500 million and $3 billion. Moody's Analytics indicated the highest losses, stating $2.5–3 billion; however, the storm's occurrence on a weekend accounted for less losses than what would otherwise be expected. Planalytics placed losses at $850 million and IHS Global Insight estimated losses between $500 million and $1 billion. Although an estimate was not provided, AON Benfield placed losses in the billions of dollars, noting similarities to the Blizzard of 1996 which inflicted $4.6 billion in economic losses. Despite the expected major losses, the rush to buy supplies ahead of the storm's arrival may mitigate the overall impact. The airline industry suffered approximately $200 million in lost revenue.

Using the Regional Snowfall Index, the storm ranked as a Category 5, "extreme", storm for the Northeast and a Category 4, "crippling", for the Southeast. It was also ranked as a Category 3, "major", event in the Ohio Valley. Approximately 103 million people were in the storm's path, including 33 million in the expected blizzard area. Half of the affected people were in the Northeast (which includes the Northeast megalopolis); the storm's RSI reached 20.138 in this region, the fourth-highest on record for the region. The primary factor driving its high classification was the affected population. The storm's RSI of 13.776 in the Southeast was the twelfth-highest on record.

Severe weather on the Gulf Coast

During January 21 through the early hours of January 22, severe thunderstorms brought damaging winds and hail to portions of Louisiana, Mississippi, Alabama, and Florida. Five tornadoes touched down across Mississippi: an EF0 near Crystal Springs, an EF0 near Homewood, an EF1 near Loyd Star, an EF1 near Pinola, and an EF2 near Sumrall. Numerous trees and power lines were downed, multiple structures were damaged, and a few were destroyed by the tornadoes. Straight line winds near Improve, Lamar County, Mississippi, significantly damaged 10–12 homes. Hail reached  in diameter in Wilmer, Louisiana. The most significant damage occurred overnight across the Florida Panhandle and neighboring Alabama. Winds gusting to  downed numerous trees and power lines and damaged structures.

Southeastern states

Snow fell across a large portion of Arkansas on January 21–22, with a daily record of  observed just outside Little Rock. Snowfall was confined to the eastern half of the state, with freezing rain amounting to  observed in northeastern counties. Strong winds in excess of —with a gust of  measured in Jonesboro—left more than 16,000 people in the state without power. One fatality near Hoxie was due to slippery roads.

Early on January 22, heavy snow fell across parts of western Tennessee. Roads around Nashville quickly became impassable, including portions of Interstates 40 and 24, and local police reported more than 200 accidents. In Lexington, Kentucky, one accident led to injury; 17 other accidents were reported. Along a  stretch of Interstate 75 in Kentucky, hundreds of drivers became stranded for more than 16 hours on January 22–23. In a separate incident, an  stretch of Interstate 77 in West Virginia was blocked by stuck tractor-trailers that were lying across the highway. The National Guard was deployed to provide people with food, water, and fuel. A transportation worker died when his truck skidded off icy roads.

Treacherous road conditions in North Carolina resulted in at least 571 accidents and 800 "service calls" from police. Five deaths were reported across the state. One person died in a collision on Interstate 95. Numerous roads were shut down accordingly. One person was killed and three others were injured in Forsyth County. An accident along Interstate 77 near Troutman resulted in the death of a 4-year-old boy. Freezing rain resulted in widespread power outages, bringing down numerous trees and power lines in the state. Many roads closed because of debris, including portions of Interstate 40 in Johnston County. Approximately 147,000 people lost power in North Carolina, with Wake County accounting for 50,000 of the total.

Four people died in South Carolina: two from carbon monoxide poisoning in Greenville, one in a car accident on an icy road in Greenville County, and another from an accident in Jonesville. Nearly 30,000 people lost power in the state. Portions of Interstates 26 and 95 were temporarily shut down for icy conditions. Flurries were observed as far south as the coastal regions of the state, including the ACE Basin as well as Charleston.

High winds downed trees and power lines, leaving approximately 66,000 people without power across the state. A postal worker was killed when strong winds blew a large branch off a tree, crushing him in his car. Snow fell as far south as Mobile, Alabama, with additional flurries extending into Jacksonville and Gainesville along the Florida Panhandle late on January 22. Further south in Florida, record rain of  fell in West Palm Beach.

Mid-Atlantic states

Baltimore, Maryland, recorded its largest snowfall on record. Two people died from heart attacks while shoveling snow and a third from undetermined causes across Maryland. A large portion of the Ocean City fishing pier was destroyed by rough seas and high winds. West Virginia's emergency management reported Interstate 77 to be "completely shut down" following an accident involving semi-trailers. The National Guard was called in to assist clearing the stranded vehicles. Six people died from snow-related incidents in Virginia. Virginia State Police responded to 989 accidents and 793 disabled vehicles through the evening of January 22. A total of 12 people died in storm-related incidents across Virginia. One person died when their car skid off a road in Chesapeake and collided with a tree. Five people died from hypothermia: one each in Charles City, Gloucester County, Hampton, Henry County, and Wise County. A combination of snow and ice accumulation caused the roof of Donk's Theatre in Hudgins, Virginia, to collapse; the structure was deemed a total loss and will be demolished. The roof of a 4,700 ft2 (437 m2) building collapsed in Charlottesville. Seven people required hospitalization for carbon monoxide poisoning at an apartment complex in Herndon when vents became clogged with snow. The snow completely destroyed two parking lots at Chincoteague National Wildlife Refuge. Three people died while shoveling snow in Washington, D.C.

Snow-related incidents resulted in nine deaths across Pennsylvania. Near Bedford, approximately 500 vehicles became stuck along a westbound stretch of the Pennsylvania Turnpike for over 24 hours from January 22–23 near the eastern approach to the Allegheny Mountain Tunnel. Among the stranded vehicles were one bus carrying the Duquesne University men's basketball team and another carrying Temple University's women's gymnastics team. Despite the scale of the incident, no major injuries were reported. The band Guster, stranded in Pittsburgh by the blocking of the turnpike, held an impromptu concert in an alley. Four people died while shoveling snow: two in both Lancaster and Montgomery counties. One of the dead in Montgomery County was a woman who was 8-months pregnant; the baby was declared dead on-scene when paramedics arrived. Another man died from carbon monoxide poisoning in his car in Reading after a passing snow plow buried his car in snow.

One person died in Magnolia, Delaware, after suffering a heart attack while shoveling. A power outage at the Delaware City Refinery, thought to be related to the storm, forced the facility to shut down after chemicals were released. A mother and her 1-year-old son died from carbon monoxide poisoning in Passaic, New Jersey, after snowfall blocked their vehicle's tailpipe; a 3-year-old girl was hospitalized, but later died on January 27. Three other people died while attempting to walk home during the blizzard: one each in East Greenwich Township, Hackensack, and Mahwah.

Before the travel ban was implemented, buses struggled to make their routes and long delays were common. This surpassed the previous record of  measured during the February 2006 blizzard. The snowstorm made January 2016 the 2nd snowiest January in New York City history, while tying it with February 1934 for the 6th snowiest month. Police across New York City responded to more than 200 accidents and 300 disabled vehicles. Emergency personnel responded to about 3,000 9-1-1 calls across the city. Five people died while shoveling snow: two in Queens, two in unknown parts of the city, and one in Staten Island. At least two deaths in Long Island were from shoveling snow. One person was killed by a snow plow in Oyster Bay Cove on Long Island.

Coastal flooding

Significant coastal flooding took place in Delaware and New Jersey. The first, and most severe, round of flooding took place during the morning of January 23. A second round took place after the storm's passage on the morning of January 24, concurrent with high tide. Record tides occurred in Lewes, Delaware. Approximately  of dunes along Delaware's  oceanfront coast sustained significant damage, with many areas flattened. Forty people required evacuation in Long Neck and Oak Orchard. Delaware Route 1 was shut down between Bethany Beach and Dewey Beach for flooding.

Tides at Cape May, New Jersey, reached a record , surpassing the previous highest of  set during Hurricane Sandy in 2012. Fifty people required evacuation in Atlantic City, and at least 150 homes were flooded. Strong winds accompanying the flooding caused damage to many homes. Streets in Ocean City and Stone Harbor were inundated with several feet of water; according to a resident in Stone Harbor, water reached  in depth on some streets. Effects were most severe along the Delaware Bay. Combined with snowfall and freezing temperatures, the flooded roads became a mix of ice and slush. Long Beach Island, still recovering from the effects of Hurricane Sandy, sustained severe beach erosion. The storm's tide and waves carved  cliffs along coastal beaches. A recently constructed dune in Belmar held back most of the water, with one minor breach along its  expanse.

New England
Southern New England experienced significant snow accumulations from Jan 23 to Jan 24. Around a foot of snow fell across Southern Connecticut, Rhode Island, and Southeastern Massachusetts. Blizzard conditions affected southeastern Massachusetts for several hours, with Nantucket and Martha's Vineyard reporting such conditions for four hours. Blizzard conditions were reported in Bridgeport for 4 hours lasting from 8 am to 12 pm. Snow totals reached 16.0 in (40.6 cm) in Norwalk, Connecticut and 13.0 in (33.0 cm) on Block Island, Rhode Island. Wind gusts on Block Island reached  while gusts in New Haven reached 52 mph (83 km/h). One person died after being struck by a snow plow.

Newfoundland and Nova Scotia
After leaving the Eastern United States, the storm complex brought light snowfall to coastal areas of Nova Scotia, Canada, on January 24. Street parking was banned in Halifax on select streets to enable easier clearing of roads. Of the 203 people on board, including crew, seven were injured. The aircraft made an emergency landing at St. John's International Airport.

Aftermath

Many cities struggled to cope with the snowfall, including Washington, D.C., where schools and government offices remained closed through January 26, three days after the storm. Schools in Baltimore, Maryland, and Philadelphia, Pennsylvania, also remained closed through January 26. Side streets around the D.C. area were unplowed through January 26. Through January 27, Washington, D.C. police issued $1,078,000 worth of parking tickets and $65,600 in fines for vehicles parked or abandoned on snow emergency routes. At least 656 vehicles were towed.

The New York Post described Queens, New York, as "basically forgotten" on January 25 as roads remained covered with snow. Many residents complained that snowplows did not come through their area until at least a day after the storm passed. Crews expressed that certain areas, such as in the Bronx, were difficult to navigate with snow plows and there was no place to put the snow. A resident of Pelham Bay stated that 3-1-1 operators were not picking up calls. Mayor De Blasio toured areas of Staten Island on January 24 and urged people to be patient. In contrast, both Governor Cuomo and Mayor De Blasio were praised for their handling of the storm prior to its arrival, and for being the first to issue a travel ban, which is credited for potentially saving lives.

New Jersey Governor Chris Christie, who flew back to the state from New Hampshire during his presidential campaign, left to resume campaigning shortly after the storm passed. He was criticized for his quick departure and heated responses to questions about why he left the state. He stated that while there was some locally significant flood damage in Southern New Jersey, the overall effects across the state did not warrant his presence. He responded to one person by saying, "I don't know what you expect me to do. You want me to go down there with a mop?" A Stockton University graduate started up a fund to provide 1,000 mops to Christie in response to his comment. On January 26, Christie apologized to North Wildwood Mayor Patrick Rosenello for calling him "crazy" during his response to criticism the day prior. Christie also requested that Rosenello apologize on his behalf to first responders, residents, and business owners.

In March, President Barack Obama declared Delaware, Maryland, New Jersey, Pennsylvania, Virginia, and Washington, D.C. major disaster areas. The federal funding would only cover costs incurred by public infrastructure, debris removal, and emergency measures to ensure public safety. Preliminary estimates places the total cost of assistance at $168,334,023, with New Jersey accounting for $82,663,604.

Snowfall measurement reviews

Following the storm, the National Weather Service conducted a review of eight snowfall observations following concerns over their quality. Measurements from Ronald Reagan Washington National Airport, Dulles International Airport, Baltimore/Washington International Airport, John F. Kennedy International Airport, LaGuardia Airport, and Philadelphia International Airport were verified as reliable. The total at Ronald Reagan Washington National Airport was brought into question immediately following the blizzard as the snow observers lost their measuring board during the storm; however, the assessment determined that proper procedure was continued even after the board was lost and the total was considered accurate. A review of measurements at Central Park, New York,  revealed the  observation was the result of a communication error and revised the storm-total to —an all-time record for New York City. Furthermore, the  measurement at Newark International Airport, New Jersey, was invalidated due to measurements being taken every hour instead of every six hours thus inflating the total. The State Climate Extremes Committee also conducted a review of a potential 24-hour state snowfall record at Mount Mitchell in North Carolina.

Snowfall accumulations and records

Naming

The storm has received several nicknames from various media outlets. The name Winter Storm Jonas was created by The Weather Channel at the beginning of the winter storm season, and assigned to the storm system when it was forecast; it has also been used in international media, and was used by New York City Mayor Bill de Blasio and the United States Postal Service. Reception of the naming of storms has been mixed; The New York Times refers to the name "Jonas" as a marketing ploy while The Weather Channel maintains that it helps others prepare in advance. The Washington Post named the storm Snowzilla, referencing the 2014–16 El Niño event which has been named the "Godzilla El Niño". Connecticut-based WFSB named the system Anna, after former First Lady Anna Harrison. Other sources have dubbed the storm simply Blizzard of 2016 or Blizzard 2016.

See also

Knickerbocker Storm
North American blizzard of 1996 – Essentially an analog of the 2016 blizzard, with similar snow totals and areas affected.
December 2009 North American blizzard
February 5–6, 2010 North American blizzard
February 9–10, 2010 North American blizzard
January 31 – February 2, 2011 North American blizzard – Another powerful winter storm that had similar impacts
February 2016 North American winter storm
Early January 2017 North American winter storm
Mid-January 2017 North American ice storm
February 9–11, 2017 North American blizzard
February 12–14, 2017 North American blizzard
February 2021 nor'easter

Notes

References

External links

Winter Storm Jonas 
Winter Storm Jonas weather images
Winter Storm Jonas in Chelsea, Manhattan.

Blizzard,01
2016,01
2016,01
North American blizzard,01
North American blizzard,01
Blizzard,01
Blizzard,01
2016,01
Nor'easters
Blizzard,2016,01
Blizzard,2016,01
Blizzard,2016,01
Blizzard,2016,01
Blizzard,2016,01
Blizzard,2016,01
Blizzard,2016,01
Blizzard,2016,01
Blizzard,2016,01
Blizzard,2016,01
Blizzard,2016,01
Blizzard,2016,01
2016,01
Blizzard,01
Blizzard,01
Blizzard,01
Blizzard,01
Blizzard,01
Blizzard,01
Blizzard,01
Blizzard,01
Blizzard,01
Blizzard,01
Blizzard,01
Blizzard,01
Blizzard,01
Blizzard,01
Blizzard,01
Blizzard,01
Blizzard,01
Blizzard,01
Blizzard,01
Blizzard,01
Blizzard
2016 disasters in Europe
2016 disasters in the United Kingdom